Francisco "Paco" Rubio (born 6 December 1953) is a French former professional footballer who played as a midfielder.

References

External links
Profile

1953 births
Living people
Sportspeople from Cher (department)
French footballers
French people of Spanish descent
Association football midfielders
Montluçon Football players
AS Nancy Lorraine players
Olympique de Marseille players
Tours FC players
Ligue 1 players
Ligue 2 players
Olympic footballers of France
Footballers at the 1976 Summer Olympics
RCP Fontainebleau managers
Footballers from Centre-Val de Loire